Onyx Cave is a solutional cave system with about  of passages formed in Permian limestone in the Santa Rita Mountains of Arizona.  It is part of the Coronado National Forest.  It was designated a National Natural Landmark in 1974.

History
The cave became a favorite spot to explore in the 1940s and 1950s.  Vandals broke the formations and used paint on many walls to the point that the entrance was gated in 1962 in order to preserve it.  Shortly afterwards the entrance was dynamited but was gated once again in 1974. Today access is controlled by Escabrosa Grotto, Inc.

See also
 Cave Of The Bells

References

External links
 Escabrosa Grotto

Caves of Arizona
Landforms of Santa Cruz County, Arizona
National Natural Landmarks in Arizona